Chaitya Bhoomi (IAST: Caityabhūmī, Officially: Dr. Babasaheb Ambedkar Mahaparinirvan Memorial) is a Buddhist chaitya and the cremation  place of B. R. Ambedkar, the chief architect of the Indian Constitution. It is situated besides Dadar Chowpatty (beach), Mumbai. Chaitya Bhoomi is a revered place of pilgrimage for Ambedkar's followers, who visit in millions annually on his death anniversary (Mahaparinirvan Diwas) on 6 December.

The Chief Minister of Maharashtra, the Governor, the Minister and many other politicians pay tribute to Ambedkar every year on 6 December in Chaitya Bhoomi. Narendra Modi, the Prime Minister of India, has also visited. Chaitya Bhoomi hosts a memorial to Ambedkar and has been graded an A-class tourism and pilgrimage site by the Government of Maharashtra.

Structural details

The structure is square in shape with a small dome divided into ground and mezzanine floors. In the square-shaped structure is a circular wall about 1.5 metres in height. In the circular area are placed the bust of Ambedkar and a statue of Gautam Buddha. The circular wall has two entrances and is furnished with marble flooring. On the mezzanine floor there is a Stupa, besides the resting place for Bhikkhus. The main entrance gate of the Chaitya Bhoomi is replica of the Gate of the Stupa of Sanchi while inside a replica of Ashoka Pillar is made.

The Chaitya Bhoomi was inaugurated by Meerabai Yashvant Ambedkar, the daughter-in-law of B. R. Ambedkar, on 5 December 1971. Here, the relics of Ambedkar are enshrined. In 2012, the Central Government led by Prime Minister Manmohan Singh cleared the transfer of Indu Mills land to the Maharashtra Government for constructing a memorial.

Mahaparinirvan Din

Ambedkar's death anniversary (December 6th) is observed as Mahaparinirvan Din. millions of people across India throng Chaitya Bhoomi to pay homage to him.

Gallery

See also
The Buddha and His Dhamma
 Dalit Buddhist Movement
 Deekshabhoomi
 Global Vipassana Pagoda
 Navayana Buddhism
 Statue of Equality

References

External links

 The day Shivaji Park turns blue; 15 Dec 2018; Bhanuj Kappal by mint

Memorials to B. R. Ambedkar
Monuments and memorials in Maharashtra
Buildings and structures in Mumbai
Stupas in India
Buddhist temples in Maharashtra